Honky Tonkin's What I Do Best is the ninth studio album by American country music artist Marty Stuart, released on June 18, 1996, by MCA Nashville. Four singles were released from this album, and they were the title track, "Thanks to You", "You Can't Stop Love", and "Sweet Love". The album peaked at #27 on the Top Country Albums chart in the United States, and #21 on the Canadian albums chart.

Track listing

Personnel
Steve Arnold - bass guitar, background vocals
Barry Beckett - Hammond organ
Mike Brignardello - bass guitar
Mark Casstevens - acoustic guitar
Brad Davis - acoustic guitar, electric guitar
Stuart Duncan - fiddle, mandolin
Gary Hogue - steel guitar
Roy Huskey Jr. - upright bass
Kirk "Jelly Roll" Johnson - harmonica
Paul Kennerley - acoustic guitar
Larry Marrs - background vocals
Jimmy Martin - vocals on "The Mississippi Mudcat and Sister Sheryl Crow"
Steve Nathan - synthesizer
Herb Pedersen - background vocals
Michael Rhodes - bass guitar
Matt Rollings - Hammond organ, piano
Gary Smith - piano
Steuart Smith - 12-string guitar, electric guitar, electric sitar
Gregg Stocki - drums
Marty Stuart - Dobro, acoustic guitar, electric guitar, mandolin, slide guitar, lead vocals, background vocals
Travis Tritt - vocals on "Honky Tonkin's What I Do Best"
Steve Turner - drums
Biff Watson - acoustic guitar

Chart performance

Album

Singles

References

 Honky Tonkin's What I Do Best album at CMT.com.

Marty Stuart albums
Albums produced by Tony Brown (record producer)
1996 albums
MCA Records albums